The Nawanagar cricket team was an Indian domestic cricket team active in first-class cricket from 1936 until 1947, operating in the West Zone of the Ranji Trophy for twelve seasons. It was based in Jamnagar, Gujarat, then part of the Nawanagar State.

Nawanagar won its only Ranji Trophy in 1936–37.

Honours
 Ranji Trophy
 Winners (1): 1936–37
 Runners-up (1): 1937–38

Notes

Indian first-class cricket teams
1936 establishments in India
1947 disestablishments in India
Cricket clubs established in 1936